Kirsten Joke Hermine Gleis  (born 22 May 1969) is a retired Dutch female volleyball player.

She played 241 matches with the Netherlands women's national volleyball team, including those at the 1992 Olympic Games, and the 1994 World Championships. 
On club level she played with Martinus Amsterdam.

Clubs
 Illinois Fighting Illini women's volleyball (1992-1993)
 Martinus Amsterdam (1994)

References

External links
 
 

1969 births
Living people
Dutch women's volleyball players
Sportspeople from Enschede
Expatriate volleyball players in the United States
Dutch expatriate sportspeople in the United States
Illinois Fighting Illini women's volleyball players
Olympic volleyball players of the Netherlands
Volleyball players at the 1992 Summer Olympics